Brynäs IF is a Swedish ice hockey team from Gävle. The club currently plays in the Swedish Hockey League (SHL), the top tier of ice hockey in Sweden. The club has played in the top-tier league since 1960, longer than any other team.

History
Brynäs IF was formed by Nils Norin, Ferdinand Blomkvist, and Thure Ternström on 12 May 1912 and began to play ice hockey in 1939. The club has also competed in association football, athletics, bandy, swimming, and water polo. The team has played in the hockey league's top flight since 1960 and has won the Swedish championship 13 times, most recently in 2012.

Brynäs IF became the world's first ice hockey club to collaborate with the United Nations Program UNICEF, after signing a five-year contract with the organisation on 20 November 2013 (expiring in 2018). On 3 June 2014, the club also signed a five-year contract with Gävle Municipality (expiring after the 2018–19 season). The municipality acquired the naming rights for the club's home arena and renamed it Gavlerinken Arena. The latter collaboration also meant the municipality would pay the club to play with ad-free jerseys, starting in the 2014–15 season, as the only SHL team. The arena is since September 2019 named Monitor ERP Arena.

In 2021, after finishing 13th (out of 14 teams) in the regular season, the team was forced to defend its SHL status for the first time since 2008, playing a best-of-seven series against the last-placed team, HV71, with home advantage.

Season-by-season
This is a partial list, featuring the five most recent completed seasons. For a more complete list, see List of Brynäs IF seasons.

Players and personnel

Current roster

Updated 18 February 2023

Team captains

 Jan Larsson (1999–2003)
 Tommy Sjödin (2003–2008)
 Andreas Dackell (2008–2012)
 Jakob Silfverberg (2012)
 Jörgen Sundqvist (2012–2014)
 Niclas Andersén (2014–2015)
 Anton Rödin (2015–2016)
 Jacob Blomqvist (2016–2019)
 Anton Rödin (2019–present)

Head coaches

 Axel Svensson (1943–1944)
 Conny Eriksson (1954–1957)
 Arne Backman (1960–1961)
 Nils Bergström (1961–1963)
 Herbert Pettersson (1963–1966)
 Börje Mattsson (1966–1967)
 Nils Bergström (1967–1969)
 Tommy Sandlin (1969–1977)
 Rolf Andersson (1977–1979)
 Lennart Johansson (1979–1980)
 Tord Lundström (1980–1981)
 Lennart Johansson (1981–1982)
 Stig Salming (1982–1987)
 Tord Lundström (1987–1988)
 Staffan Tholson (1988–1991)
 Tommy Sandlin (1991–1996)
 Göran Sjöberg (1996–1998)
 Roger Melin (1998–2002)
 Esko Nokelainen (2002)
 Gunnar Persson (2002–2004)
 Tomas Jonsson (2004)
 Roger Kyrö (2004–2005)
 Wayne Fleming (2005–2005)
 Leif Boork (2005–2007)
 Olof Östblom (2007–2008)
 Tomas Thelin (2008)
 Leif Boork (2008)
 Niklas Czarnecki (2008–2011)
 Tommy Jonsson (2011–2014)
 Thomas Berglund (2014–2017)
 Roger Melin (2017–2017)
 Tommy Sjödin (2017–2018)
 Magnus Sundquist (2018–2020)
 Peter Andersson (2020–2021)
 Mikko Manner (2021-present)

Franchise records and leaders

Individual season records
 Most Goals in a season: Tom Bissett, 40 (1998–99)
 Most Assists in a season: Jan Larsson, 43 (1998–99)
 Most Points in a season: Lars-Göran Nilsson, 62 (1970–71)
 Most Penalty Minutes in a season: Tommy Melkersson, 118 (1996–97)
 Most Points in a season, defenseman: Pär Djoos, 48 (1998–99)

Scoring leaders 

These are the top-ten point-scorers in SHL history. Figures are updated after each completed SHL regular season.

Note: Pos = Position; GP = Games played; G = Goals; A = Assists; Pts = Points; P/G = Points per game;  = current Brynäs IF player

Trophies and awards

Team
Le Mat Trophy
 1963–64, 1965–66, 1966–67, 1967–68, 1969–70, 1970–71, 1971–72, 1975–76, 1976–77, 1979–80, 1992–93, 1998–99, 2011–12

Individual

Coach of the Year
 Tommy Sandlin: 1991–92, 1992–93
 Roger Melin: 1998–99

Guldhjälmen
 Jan Larsson: 1998–99
 Jakob Silfverberg: 2011–2012

Guldpucken
 Håkan Wickberg: 1970–71
 William Löfqvist: 1971–72
 Stig Östling: 1974–75
 Mats Näslund: 1979–80
 Tommy Sjödin: 1991–92

Håkan Loob Trophy
 Kenneth Andersson: 1983–84
 Evgeny Davydov: 1996–97
 Tom Bissett: 1998–99
 Jan Larsson: 1999-00

Honken Trophy
 Johan Holmqvist: 2005–06
 Jacob Markström: 2009–10

Rinkens Riddare
 Lars Bylund: 1968–69
 Håkan Wickberg: 1969–70
 Jan-Erik Lyck: 1971–72

Rookie of the Year
 Nicklas Bäckström: 2005–06
 Jacob Markström: 2009–10
 Mattias Ekholm: 2010–11
 Johan Larsson:2011-12

References

External links

  

Ice hockey teams in Sweden
Sport in Gävle
Swedish Hockey League teams
1912 establishments in Sweden
Ice hockey clubs established in 1912
Ice hockey teams in Gävleborg County